Ischnura perparva, the western forktail, is a species of narrow-winged damselfly in the family Coenagrionidae. It is found in North America.

The IUCN conservation status of Ischnura perparva is "LC", least concern, with no immediate threat to the species' survival. The population is stable. The IUCN status was reviewed in 2017.

References

Further reading

 

Ischnura
Articles created by Qbugbot
Insects described in 1876